Holly Fields is an American actress.

Career 
Fields was Molly Ringwald's understudy at age 7 in Through the Looking Glass. After touring the country in the national show, she joined the Broadway cast of Annie at age ten. She starred in many other shows, including the National Tour of A Christmas Carol as Tiny Tim for two years. Following success on stage, she transitioned to television, commercials and modeling.  Fields, then age 13, was booked for the CBS pilot for CBS Summer Playhouse: Fort Figueroa (1988) and starred alongside Charles Haid.

She then appeared in over 100 commercials and 40 TV shows and films by the end of 1990, including MacGyver, Charles in Charge, Charmed, Quantum Leap, and Growing Pains. For her extensive work during this time, she was presented with two Youth in Film awards for “Best Newcomer” and “Best Female Guest Star.” 

Christopher Guest then cast her in The Big Picture (1989).

She discovered at an early age that she was able to copy voices, and after looping for others when asked, she became a professional voice match artist/looper. She voiced Cameron Diaz's voice and singing in over 60 projects, including Princess Fiona in Shrek. Holly re-voiced stars such as Drew Barrymore, Kate Bosworth, Leslie Mann, Brittany Murphy, Paula Abdul, Gwen Stefani, Britney Spears, Jennifer Love Hewitt, and Hailee Steinfeld.

Holly starred in Wishmaster 2, Seed People, and other horror films. She voiced Nadia Grell in the video game Star Wars: The Old Republic.

Holly is set to star in The Reel Deal alongside Eric Roberts, Don Wilson, Judy Norton, Dustin Diamond, and Tim Russ. Produced by Adryenn Ashley, the reality show pairs celebrities with up and coming actors, writers, directors and composers to make a movie in 4 days. Holly appeared on The OC as Aunt Cindy, Julie Cooper's trashy sister.

Fields sings with bands and does vocal work on albums, including three of her own. She was produced by Robbie Nevil and Joey Carbone and was given a record deal in Japan, where she tours.

She is the great granddaughter of Edward B. Gross, who was one of the founders of Cannery Row. She is grandniece of Slim Hawks and Howard Hawks.

Video games

References

External links
 

Living people
20th-century American actresses
21st-century American actresses
American television actresses
American film actresses
American video game actresses
American voice actresses
American child actresses
Year of birth missing (living people)